Brazil: Forró – Music for Maids and Taxi Drivers is a various artists genre compilation album that was dedicated to Forró, a music style from Brazil. Released in 1989, the album was nominated for the Best Traditional Folk Album in the 33rd Annual Grammy Awards two years later.

According to US producer Gerald Seligman, the original tracks were produced by Zé da Flauta, who came to prominence in the group Quinteto Violado, founded in Recife in 1970 and most active throughout that decade. Zé sold the forró master tapes and all rights to Rio de Janeiro-based Carlão de Andrade of Visom Records, who pressed them intending for the sales to help fund the start-up of his label of instrumental music. There they languished until Seligman spied them in a Visom closet in 1987. He took them back to NY, recognized their value as a rare example of roots forró music and approached both GlobeStyle Records in the UK and Rounder in the US to gauge interest in a compilation. Both signed on. Seligman also commissioned acclaimed woodblock artist Marcelo Soares to create the cover in the style of Literatura de Cordel, which are popular rhyming broadsides distributed throughout the Brazilian Northeast.

Track listing

Awards & Nominations

References 

1989 compilation albums
Forró compilation albums
Compilation albums by Brazilian artists